USS Edith (No. 3459) was a supply ship in the United States Navy.

The U.S. Navy acquiredSS Edith from the United States Shipping Board for service during World War I and commissioned her as USS Edith on 1 October 1918.

Operational history 
On 1 November 1918, Edith sailed for Nantes, France, with a cargo of ammunition and trucks. Returning to New York City on 12 December 1918, she loaded cargo destined for South America, discharging a portion at Bahia, Brazil, and the remainder at Rio de Janeiro, Brazil. At Santos, Brazil, she took on sugar cane for delivery to New Orleans, Louisiana; however, engine trouble caused her to complete the trip under tow by the U.S. Navy tug .

Decommissioning 
Edith was decommissioned on 18 May 1919 and returned to her owner.

Later career 

The ship returned to commercial service as SS Edith.

References

External links
 Dictionary of American Naval Fighting Ships 

Cargo ships of the United States Navy
World War I auxiliary ships of the United States
World War I cargo ships of the United States
Ships built in Maryland
1915 ships
Maritime incidents in June 1942
Ships sunk by German submarines in World War II
World War II shipwrecks in the Caribbean Sea